Austinville may be any of the following places:

 Austinville, Virginia, a town in the United States
 Austinville, Iowa, a town in the United States
 Proctor, West Virginia, a town in the United States also known as Austinville
 Austinville, Queensland, a suburb of the Gold Coast in Queensland, Australia.

See also 
 Austin (disambiguation)
 Austinburg (disambiguation)
 Austintown